A military democracy is a war-based society that practices democracy. The category is often applied to historical peoples. An example is Frederick Engels' characterization:

According to Engels, the Greek Heroic Age was a typical example of military democracy. Lewis Henry Morgan spoke of two features: "the military state of society, and the system of administration consisting of an elective and removable supreme chief, a council of elders and a popular assembly."

See also 
 Jair Bolsonaro
 Meiji Restoration

References

Warriors
Social history
Social conflict
Types of democracy